This is the discography of American rapper Gorilla Zoe.

Albums

Studio albums

Extended plays

Mixtapes

Singles

As lead artist

As featured performer

Guest appearances

Music videos

See also 
 Boyz n da Hood discography

References 

Derrtie Al Featuring Gorilla Zoe Soundcloud

Discographies of American artists
Hip hop discographies